Sergey Dyachkov (born May 28, 1982) is an Azerbaijani former swimmer, who specialized in sprint freestyle events. Dyachkov qualified for the men's 100 m freestyle at the 2004 Summer Olympics in Athens, by receiving a Universality place from FINA, in an entry time of 57.73. He challenged six other swimmers in heat one, including 34-year-old Mumtaz Ahmed of Pakistan. He raced to fifth place in 58.26, more than half a second (0.50) off his entry time. Dyachkov failed to advance into the semifinals, as he placed sixty-seventh overall out of 71 swimmers in the preliminaries.

References

1982 births
Living people
Azerbaijani male freestyle swimmers
Olympic swimmers of Azerbaijan
Swimmers at the 2004 Summer Olympics
Sportspeople from Baku
21st-century Azerbaijani people